Deborah Oluwaseun Odeyemi (born 21 February 1995) is a Nigerian sprinter who specializes in the 100 metres, 200 metres, 4 x 100 metres and the sprint medley relay. She competed in the 4 × 100 metres relay event at the 2015 World Championships in Athletics in Beijing, China.

Doping
Odeyemi tested positive for the anabolic steroid metenolone in a sample collected at the Nigerian Championship on 30 July 2015. Her results from the 2015 World Championships in Athletics were annulled and she was handed a four-year ban from sports.

References

External links
 

1995 births
Doping cases in athletics
Living people
Nigerian female sprinters
Nigerian sportspeople in doping cases
World Athletics Championships athletes for Nigeria
Yoruba sportswomen
20th-century Nigerian women
21st-century Nigerian women